Qingchengshan railway station is a railway station of Chengdu–Dujiangyan Intercity Railway. The station located in Dujiangyan, Chengdu, Sichuan, China.

Destinations and Prices

Rolling stock
China Railways CRH1A

See also
Chengdu–Dujiangyan Intercity Railway

References 
The information in this article is based on that in its Chinese equivalent.

Stations on the Chengdu–Dujiangyan Intercity Railway
Railway stations in Sichuan
Railway stations in China opened in 2010